Nelson López (born 24 June 1941) was an Argentine football defender who played for Argentina in the 1966 FIFA World Cup. He also played for Club Atlético Banfield.

References

External links
FIFA profile

1941 births
Living people
Argentine footballers
Argentina international footballers
Association football defenders
1966 FIFA World Cup players